William Clark House may refer to:

William A. Clark House, Manhattan, New York City
William S. Clark House, Eureka, California, NRHP-listed
William Clark House (Newark, New Jersey), NRHP-listed
William Clark House (Baraboo, Wisconsin), listed on the NRHP in Sauk County, Wisconsin

See also
Clark House (disambiguation)